Vincenzo Boni (born 1 March 1988) is an Italian Paralympic swimmer with Charcot–Marie–Tooth disease.

Career
He represented Italy at the 2016 Summer Paralympics and won a bronze medal in the men's 50 metre backstroke S3 event.

Boni is an athlete of the Gruppo Sportivo Fiamme Oro.

References

External links 
 
 Vincenzo Boni – Glasgow 2015 IPC Swimming World Championships at the International Paralympic Committee

Living people
1988 births
Italian male swimmers
Paralympic swimmers of Italy
Paralympic bronze medalists for Italy
Paralympic medalists in swimming
Swimmers at the 2016 Summer Paralympics
Swimmers at the 2020 Summer Paralympics
Medalists at the 2016 Summer Paralympics
Medalists at the World Para Swimming Championships
Medalists at the World Para Swimming European Championships
Swimmers of Fiamme Oro
Place of birth missing (living people)
S3-classified Paralympic swimmers